Izak George Reid (born 8 July 1987) is an English footballer who plays for Northern Premier League Premier Division side Hednesford Town, where he plays as a midfielder.

Playing career
Reid came through the ranks at Macclesfield Town and became a regular member of the first team in the 2007–08 season. By the time he had signed a new two-year deal with the Silkmen in July 2009 he had made 78 appearances in all competitions.

Reid signed for Morecambe on Saturday 18 June 2011 after passing a medical. He has since played for Brackley Town, Barrow and A.F.C. Telford United.

Izak joined his hometown club Stafford Rangers in the summer of 2016.

On 23 February 2019, Izak was confirmed as signing for Northern Premier League Division One West side Chasetown.

Reid made a prompt move to Northern Premier League Premier Division side Hednesford Town on 22 March 2019.

International career
Reid is eligible to play for Montserrat.

Personal life
Reid has two brothers who also play football, Levi and Ishmale, both with Stafford Rangers.

References

External links

1987 births
Living people
Sportspeople from Stafford
English footballers
Association football midfielders
Macclesfield Town F.C. players
English Football League players
Barrow A.F.C. players
Brackley Town F.C. players
Morecambe F.C. players
AFC Telford United players
Stafford Rangers F.C. players
Chasetown F.C. players
Hednesford Town F.C. players